The Departmental Council of Corrèze (French: Conseil départemental de la Corrèze), formerly the General Council of Corrèze (Conseil général de la Corrèze, until 2015), is the departmental council of Corrèze, Nouvelle-Aquitaine, France. It was presided over by François Hollande from 2008 to 2012, who departed from this position when he took office as the President of France on 15 May 2012. It includes 38 members, known as departmental councillors (conseillers départementaux) or general councillors (conseillers généraux) until 2015.

Composition
The assembly of Departmental Council of Correze is made up of a President, seven vice presidents and thirty departmental councillors with the later two groups representing various cantons of the Correze. Two departmental councillors from each canton are elected for six years by a two-round majority vote.

Seats

By party

By political groups

List of presidents

Current membership 

 Canton of Argentat : François Bretin (PCF)
 Canton of Ayen : Gérard Bonnet (PS)
 Canton of Beaulieu sur Dordogne : Jacques Descargues (PS)
 Canton of Beynat : Pascal Coste (UMP)
 Canton of Bort Les-Orgues : Jean-Pierre Dupont (UMP)
 Canton of Bugeat : Christophe Petit (UMP)
 Canton of Brive-la-Gaillarde (Centre) : Frédéric Soulier (UMP)
 Canton of Brive-la-Gaillarde (North East) : Claude Nougein (UMP)
 Canton of Brive-la-Gaillarde (North West) : Michel Da Cunha (PS)
 Canton of Brive-la-Gaillarde (South East) : Jean-Claude Chauvignat (EELV)
 Canton of Brive-la-Gaillarde (South West) : Alain Vacher (PCF)
 Canton of Corrèze : Bernadette Chirac (UMP)
 Canton of Donzenac : Gilbert Fronty (PS)
 Canton of Eygurande : Alain Ballay (PS)
 Canton of Egletons : Michel Paillassou (UMP)
 Canton of Juillac : Jean-Claude Yardin (PS)
 Canton of Lubersac : Jean-Pierre Decaie (DVD)
 Canton of La Roche Canillac : Bernard Combes (PS)
 Canton of Larche : Jean-Jacques Delpech (UMP)
 Canton of Lapleau : Bertrand Chassagnard (UMP)
 Canton of Malemort sur Corrèze : Robert Penalva (PS)
 Canton of Mercoeur : Lucien Delpeuch (UMP)
 Canton of Meymac : Jean-Pierre Audy (UMP)
 Canton of Meyssac : Henri Salvant (UMP)
 Canton of Neuvic : Henri Roy (DVG)
 Canton of Saint Privat : Serge Galliez (UMP)
 Canton of Seilhac : Noël Martinie (PS)
 Canton of Sornac : Pierre Coutaud (DVG)
 Canton of Tulle (South campaign) : Roger Chassagnard (PS)
 Canton of Tulle (North campaign) : Jean-Claude Peyramard (PS)
 Canton of Tulle (South Urban) : Dominique Grador (PCF)
 Canton of Tulle (North Urban) : Pierre Diederichs (PS)
 Canton of Treignac : Daniel Chasseing (DVD)
 Canton of Ussel (East) : Daniel Delpy (UMP)
 Canton of Ussel (West) : Christophe Arfeuillere (UMP)
 Canton of Uzerche : Sophie Dessus (PS)
 Canton of Vigeois : François Hollande - President (PS)

Last elections 

 2008 French cantonal elections
 2011 French cantonal elections

External links 
 Corrèze General Council official website

Corrèze
Departmental councils (France)